Anton Eduardovich Vaino (born 17 February 1972) is a Russian diplomat and politician of Estonian descent. Currently he is the Chief of Staff of the Presidential Executive Office. Vaino is the grandson of Karl Vaino, the former First Secretary of the Communist Party of Estonia.

Biography 
Vaino graduated from the Moscow State Institute of International Relations at the Russian Foreign Ministry in 1996, with a degree in international relations.

He worked in the Embassy of Russia in Tokyo and later in the Second Asian Department at the Russian Foreign Ministry. Vaino joined the Russian Presidential Protocol Directorate in 2002. He worked as deputy head of the Presidential Protocol Scheduling Directorate. He was named to first deputy head of this department in 2007, then deputy chief of the Government Staff, later chief of the Prime Minister's Protocol and deputy chief of the Government Staff in 2008.

In 2016 he claimed to invent a nooscope which he claimed was an instrument for analyzing the noosphere equivalent to a microscope in importance.

He is the author of Image of Victory, and has a published academic article, The Capitalization of the Future.

2022 Russian invasion of Ukraine 
In February 2022, Vaino was put on the European Union sanctions list for "actively supporting and implementing actions and policies that undermine and threaten the territorial integrity, sovereignty and independence of Ukraine as well as the stability or security in Ukraine." On 6 April 2022, the Office of Foreign Assets Control of the United States Department of the Treasury added Vaino to its own sanctions list.

Personal life 
Vaino is married and has a son.

Awards and decorations
 Russian Federation Presidential Certificate of Honour (2012)
 Russian Federation Presidential Certificate of Gratitude (2005)

References

External links
Anton Vaino's profile

1972 births
1st class Active State Councillors of the Russian Federation
Estonian emigrants to Russia
Living people
Moscow State Institute of International Relations alumni
Politicians from Tallinn
Russian diplomats
Kremlin Chiefs of Staff
Russian people of Estonian descent
Russian individuals subject to European Union sanctions
Russian individuals subject to the U.S. Department of the Treasury sanctions
Russian transhumanists